Broadcasters for the Tampa Bay Rays Major League Baseball team.

Television

Play by Play
Dewayne Staats (1998–present)
Todd Kalas (1998–2016)
Rich Hollenberg (2014–present)
Kevin Burkhardt (2019–present)

Color Commentary
Joe Magrane (1998–2008)
Kevin Kennedy (2009–2010)
Brian Anderson (2008–present)
Orestes Destrade (2011–2023)
Doug Waechter (2015–present)

Host
Todd Kalas (1998–2016)
Rich Hollenberg (2014–present)

Radio
Paul Olden and Charlie Slowes (1998–2004)
Andy Freed (2005–present)
Dave Wills (2005–2023)

Spanish Radio

Play by Play
Enrique Oliu (2001–present)
Danny Martinez (2003–2004)
José Rafael Colmenares Anzola (2005)
Ricardo Tavaras (2006–Present)

Color Commentary
Enrique Oliu (2003–present)
Leonte Landino (2004)

See also
 Tampa Bay Rays Radio Network
 List of current Major League Baseball announcers

References

Tampa Bay Rays
 
Broadcasters
SportsChannel
Fox Sports Networks
Bally Sports